Nayland College is a coeducational state secondary school located in Stoke, Nelson, New Zealand. It is one of three secondary schools in Nelson which are coeducational. The school was officially opened on 3 February 1966.

Crest
The crest is divided into quarters. The sailing ship represents discovery, the model of the atom represents research in reference to Lord Rutherford's work. The pine cone references forestry and the importance of this industry in New Zealand. The migratory godwit represents dispersal of students throughout the world.

Extra-curricular
Notable extra-curricular activities of the college include its well-regarded student produced newspaper and biennial musical productions. "The Circuit" is the longest running high school newspaper in New Zealand.

The school has an active sports department with two gyms and multiple health and physical education rooms. Nayland College's best finish at the New Zealand Secondary School Football Championship was second place in 2010. Former student Gagame Feni is a regular for ASB Premiership side Canterbury United. Jeremy Brockie is a former Nayland College student and more recently Coey Turipa, Jamie Doris and Alex Ridsdale have all gone on to star for their specific New Zealand age-grade side.

Notable alumni

Arts
 Kristian Lavercombe, actor and singer
 Carthew Neal, film, television and interactive producer  
 Laura Solomon, prize-winning novelist, playwright and poet

Politics
 Chester Borrows, member of parliament for Whanganui

Sports
 Jeremy Brockie, All White
 Ceri Evans, former All White defender; also a Rhodes Scholar
 Brenda Lawson, World Double Sculls Champion, Olympian 4th place 1992
 Robbie Malneek, Former professional rugby union player for 
 Liam Malone, 2016 Paralympic gold medallist
 Jacky Ruben, Vanuatu national football team member

References

Secondary schools in Nelson, New Zealand
New Zealand secondary schools of Nelson plan construction
Educational institutions established in 1966
1966 establishments in New Zealand